Dichomeris yuebana is a moth in the family Gelechiidae. It was described by Hou-Hun Li and Zhe-Min Zheng in 1996. It is found in the Chinese provinces of Shaanxi and Sichuan.

References

Moths described in 1996
yuebana